"You Talk Too Much" is the third track on Run–D.M.C.'s second studio album, King of Rock. It was released as the second single from the album in 1985.
The song was released as a 12" single and the B-side of the UK pressing also featured the tracks "Sucker MC's" (originally from the album Run-D.M.C.) and "Darryl and Joe (Krush-Groove 3)" (also from King of Rock).

Track listing
7" – Profile (US) / 4th & B'way Records (UK)
 "You Talk Too Much" – 3:58
 "Darryl and Joe (Krush-Groove 3)" – 4:03

12" – Profile (US)
 "You Talk Too Much" – 6:50
 "Darryl and Joe (Krush-Groove 3)" – 6:30
 "You Talk Too Much (Instrumental)" – 6:50
 "Darryl and Joe (Krush-Groove 3) (Instrumental)" – 6:30

12" – 4th & B'way Records (UK)
 "You Talk Too Much (Oral O.D. Mix)" – 6:50
 "You Talk Too Much (Mute Mix)" – 6:53
 "Sucker MC's" – 3:07
 "Daryll and Joe" – 6:25

Charts

Notes:

 1 - Charted with "Darryl and Joe (Krush-Groove 3)"

References

1985 singles
1985 songs
Run-DMC songs
Songs written by Darryl McDaniels
Songs written by Jam Master Jay
Songs written by Joseph Simmons
Profile Records singles